The Center for Photography at Woodstock (CPW) is a not-for-profit artist-centered organization to develop and promote contemporary photography, located in Kingston, New York. It began operations in 1977 under the name Catskill Center for Photography and was located in Woodstock until 2022. The center offers various programs from exhibitions and workshops to artist residencies and access to professional workspace.

History 
The Center for Photography at Woodstock, originally called the Catskill Center for Photography, was founded in 1977 as a non-for-profit organization to provide support to artists working in the photographic arts. Howard Greenberg and Michael Feinberg, the original founders, created the photo center due to the lack of support for photographers in the area. Since the start of CPW, the center has offered workshops, exhibitions, and a black and white darkroom.

Today, CPW offers direct support to artists through a variety of programs, such as artist residencies, fellowships, workshops,  exhibitions, and state-of-the-art digital and darkroom facilities. Through these various programs and a rapidly changing art world, CPW constantly raises awareness as well as challenges and questions the current movement of contemporary photography.  CPW inhabits its own permanent print collection and a library containing over 1,500 artist books.

Exhibitions

Program history 
Since 1977 CPW has presented over 500 exhibitions. CPW currently presents 6 - 8 exhibitions annually including curated group and solo exhibitions and the annual Photography Now juried show. The exhibitions are free and open to the public, reaching out to anyone in the community who has a passion and interest in the photographic arts.

There are several ways for artists to get their work exhibited. There are general submission reviews, portfolio reviews, and an annual juried show, Photography Now. CPW participates in NYC portfolio reviews as well as in the national SPE conference. Members have access to a free portfolio review with CPW's staff.

Workshop and lecture series

Program history 
The core of CPW's educational programs are the Woodstock Photography Workshops, which allow artists to explore and focus on specific topics in an intimate and personal setting. Beginning in 1978, the workshops range on topics, skills, and age level, from learning about antiquated photographic processes to expanding ones smartphone photography. There are select workshops where instructors will also give a lecture that is open to the public.

Notable instructors
Throughout its history CPW has brought in many notable artists and educators to lead workshops including most recently Sam Abell, Craig J Barber, Dawoud Bey, Elinor Carucci, Ron Haviv, Christopher James, Ed Kashi, Bobbi Lane, Mary Ellen Mark, along with many others.

Woodstock A-I-R program

Program history
The Artist in Residency program was established in 1999, and has provided services for nearly 100 artists and is named one of the top 20 artist residencies the country by Artinfo. The Woodstock A-I-R Program was created to support artists of color working in photography. The program provides full use of CPW's facilities, support, and time. Participants receive honorarium, housing, food and travel stipend, and significantly reduced rates on materials.

Artist workspace / NYSAWC
Ranging from 3–6 weeks the residency program allows for artists to focus solely on their artwork and take a break from everyday life. The residency includes a food and travel stipend, honorarium, house accommodations, 24/7 access to the facilities, and exhibition opportunities. CPW was invited to participate in the New York State Artist Workspace Consortium in 2004 and contributed to NYSAWC efforts to define the field of artist workspace residencies. Other members included were the Carriage House Workspace at the Islip Art Museum, Lower East Side Printshop, Sculpture Space, Smack Mellon, Socrates Sculpture Park, and Women's Studio Workshop.

Notable residents

Artists
 William Cordova
 LaToya Ruby Frazier
 Nikita Gale
 Nydia Blas
 Tommy Kha
Alma Leiva
 Xaviera Simmons

Critical studies
 Emilie Boone
 Nicole Caruth
 Liz Park
 crystal a.m. nelson

Permanent print collection

History 

Beginning in 1980, CPW has collected over 1,750 prints, videos, and photo-based works. Artists include participants in CPW's programs such as Woodstock A-I-R and Exhibitions. Many of the works have been donated by artists and private donors. In addition, CPW has purchased a work by an artist featured in its annual Photography Now exhibition since 2001. Recipients of CPW's Photographer's Fellowship Fund and WOODSTOCK A-I-R are required to contribute a sample of their completed work to the collection which serves as an archive of CPW's program activities.

Key works 
 Elinor Carucci
 Larry Fink
 David Maisel
 Mary Ellen Mark
 Andrea Modica
 Stephen Shore
 Aaron Siskind
 W. Eugene Smith
 Edward Weston
 Minor White
 Gaede/ Striebel Archive

Dorsky partnership 
The permanent print collection has been on held on extended loan at the Samuel Dorsky Museum of Art (SDMA) since 1995. The SDMA has been opened since 2000 and is one of the largest art museums within the SUNY system, with over 17,000 square feet. SDMA is a vital resource to the community in showing historical and contemporary art and has their own permanent collection including over 5,000 works. The museum periodically mounts exhibitions culled from CPW's collection including:
 All Hot and Bothered curated by Ariel Shanberg and Brian Wallace (June 27 – September 28, 2008)
 Thoughts of Home curated by Wayne Lempka (January 26 – March 18, 2011)
 Race, Love, and Labor curated by Sarah Lewis (August 27 – December 14, 2014)

Photography Quarterly

Photography Quarterly, created in 1979 by the original founders, began as a black and white brochure, aimed to spread ideas and awareness about fine art photography beyond Woodstock. The publication evolved into a full color, 60-page spread magazine featuring exhibitions, curatorial essays, and artist portfolios. PQ was last published in 2009.

Photographers’ Fellowship fund

Program history 
The Fellowship fund began in 1980 and has given over $77,000 to 87 regional artists. When the fund began it was initially awarded to two artists who received $1,000 each. Now the fund is awarded to one artist a year who receives $2,500. The awarded fellow is required to donate a work to CPW's Permanent Print Collection.

Notable recipients
 Craig J. Barber
 Lucinda Devlin
 Isaac Diggs
 Kenro Izu
 Tanya Marcuse
 Andrea Modica
 Neil C. Trager

Services for artists

Workspace 
The Center for Photography at Woodstock is equipped with state of the art digital lab, darkroom, and library.

Digital Kitchen
Established in 2007. The Digital Kitchen is a community workspace utilized by area artists, CPW's workshops, and artists-in-residence. A Lab Manager provides technical support and mentors users.

Darkroom
The Darkroom is equipped for black-and-white film processing and printing. Staff provide support and mentors users.

Library
The Library includes over 1,500 monographs, exhibition catalogs, texts, and periodicals and is open to the public. This library is one of the most extensive photographic collections in the region including monographs, exhibition catalogs, critical texts, and publications including Aperture, Art Papers, Nueva Luz, PQ and Blindspot.

Recent additions have been made such as, Brian Ulrich's Is This Place Great or What?, Robert Adams’ The Place We Live, Michal Chelbin's The Black Eye, and Diego Uchitel's Polaroids.

Photographer’s Salon 
The photographers’ Salon is a critic group that meets once a month and is run by Richard Edelman and Carlos Loret de Mola.  The Salon was previously run by Lilo Raymond and Dan McCormack in the 70's and 80's and then led by Harriet Tannin and Levi Cruz in the 90's.  The Salon allows artists to gain new and insightful perspective from other artists in the area and gives them a chance to give and receive useful feedback.

Membership 
There are several levels of membership at CPW: basic, advanced, student, senior, friend/family, and patron. Memberships provide support for the organization, and each is given specific benefits.

Board of directors 
The Board currently consists of 13 elected members who give support to CPW and play an active role in the organization's affairs.
 Howard Greenberg – Founder, Chair
 Stan Sagner – President
 Barry Mayo – Vice President
 Clinton Cargill – Treasurer
 Jesse Blatt – Secretary
 Alex Davis
 Michael Knauth
 Aaron Rezny
 Jed Root
 Tevis Trower
 William Van Roden
 Steven Wechsler
 Andy Young
(as of June 2018)

Notable funding contributors 
 Andy Warhol Foundation for the Visual Arts
 Edith & Phillip Leonian Foundation
 New York State Council on the Arts
 National Endowment for the Arts
 Thompson Family Foundation
 Milton & Sally Avery Arts Foundation

References

External links
 
 CPW's Flickr Page
 Light Box review of The Space Between: Redefining the Public and Personal in Smartphone Photography
 Photo Booth review of The Space Between
 CPW's A-I-R exhibition at the Dorsky Race, Love, and Labor
 PDN article about the WOODSTOCK A-I-R Program
 CPW's Spot Light Lucie Award film
 APhoto interview with Director Ariel Shanberg
 Art Daily Review of Sara Macel's Show
 Dorsky's Partnership with CPW
 Information about CPW's Programs
 Hudson Valley Alamanac review of the 2014 Photography Now show

American photography organizations
Photography museums and galleries in the United States
Art museums and galleries in New York (state)
Non-profit organizations based in New York (state)
Tourist attractions in Ulster County, New York
Woodstock, New York
Arts organizations established in 1977
1977 establishments in New York (state)